"San Buenaventura" is also the official name of the city in Southern California, United States, normally referred to as Ventura, California.  It can also refer to Mission San Buenaventura.

San Buenaventura is a town and seat of the surrounding municipality of the same name in the northern Mexican state of Coahuila. 
There were 19,986 inhabitants in 2000.

External links
Municipal information on Coahuila state website 

Populated places in Coahuila